Woodville was a parliamentary electorate in the Manawatū-Whanganui region of New Zealand from 1887 to 1890.

Population centres
In the 1887 electoral redistribution, although the Representation Commission was required through the Representation Act 1887 to maintain existing electorates "as far as possible", rapid population growth in the North Island required the transfer of three seats from the South Island to the north. Ten new electorates were created, including Woodville, and one former electorate was recreated.

The electorate was based on the town of Woodville. The localities of Ormondville, Dannevirke, and Norsewood were in the northern part of the electorate.

History
The 1887 election was contested by William Cowper Smith, Horace Baker and William Wilson McCardle, who obtained 922, 761, and 452 votes, respectively. Smith was thus declared elected.

Smith had since 1881 represented the  electorate. McCardle had in 1884 unsuccessfully contested the Wairarapa North electorate against George Beetham.

Members of Parliament
Woodville was represented by one Member of Parliament.

Key

1887 election

Notes

References

Historical electorates of New Zealand
Politics of Manawatū-Whanganui
1887 establishments in New Zealand
1890 disestablishments in New Zealand